Professionally Damaged is a six-song EP by the American rock band Berlin Airlift. It was released in 1983 by Lo-Tech Records. The EP features Hunger Strikes, number one local song of 1983 on Boston radio station WBCN.

Track listing
All songs by Rick Berlin.
"Stop and Think About It" – 2:02
"I Don't Know How to Be Cool" – 4:13
"Hunger Strikes" – 7:11
"Do it Tonight" – 3:21
"Not Guilty" – 4:21
"Smoke Is Risin'" – 5:21

Credits
Rick Berlin - vocals
Steven Paul Perry - Guitar, vocals
Jane Balmond - Keyboards
Chet Cahill - Bass, Vocals
Glen Moran - drums

References

1983 EPs
Berlin Airlift (band) albums